James Tyree Poston (born June 1, 1993) is an American professional golfer on the PGA Tour, where he is a two-time winner.

Early life

In high school, while competing for Hickory High School, Poston shot a North Carolina High School Athletic Association (NCHSAA) golf tournament record 63. In college, Poston competed for Western Carolina University where he won six times including two consecutive Southern Conference titles.

Professional career
After starting 2016 with no status on any tour, Poston Monday qualified for the United Leasing Championship on the Web.com Tour and finished T23. His finish earned him entry into the Rex Hospital Open, where a tie for third earned him Special Temporary Member status for the season. Five more top 15s, including two second-place finishes, resulted in Poston finishing 10th on the regular-season money list and earning a 2017 PGA Tour card.

On August 4, 2019, Poston earned his first professional victory by winning the Wyndham Championship, after shooting an 8-under 62 in the final round and going bogey-free in the tournament. He became the first player since 1974 to win a PGA Tour event while going bogey-free.

On July 3, 2022, Poston won the John Deere Classic by three strokes over Christiaan Bezuidenhout and Emiliano Grillo. Poston led after each round of the tournament, becoming the first player since 1992 to win the tournament wire-to-wire. This win also secured him a spot in the 2022 Open Championship.

Amateur wins
2011 Trusted Choice Big I National Championship
2013 Southwestern Amateur, Golfweek Program Challenge, Cardinal Intercollegiate, Hummingbird Intercollegiate
2014 SoCon Championship
2015 Wexford Plantation Intercollegiate, SoCon Championship

Source:

Professional wins (2)

PGA Tour wins (2)

PGA Tour playoff record (0–1)

Playoff record
Web.com Tour playoff record (0–1)

Results in major championships
Results not in chronological order in 2020.

CUT = missed the half-way cut
"T" = tied
NT = No tournament due to COVID-19 pandemic

Results in The Players Championship

"T" indicates a tie for a place
CUT = missed the halfway cut
C = Canceled after the first round due to the COVID-19 pandemic

Results in World Golf Championships

1Cancelled due to COVID-19 pandemic

NT = No tournament
"T" = tied

PGA Tour career summary

* As of the 2022 season.

See also
2016 Web.com Tour Finals graduates

References

External links

American male golfers
PGA Tour golfers
Korn Ferry Tour graduates
Golfers from North Carolina
Western Carolina University alumni
People from Hickory, North Carolina
People from St. Simons, Georgia
1993 births
Living people